Rancho Veloz is a Cuban village and consejo popular ("people's council", i.e. hamlet) of the municipality of Corralillo, in Villa Clara Province. It is a small town whose population numbers between 4,549 (officially) and 6,320.

History
During the 19th century, Spaniard settlers arrived in Cuba to work on the islands' agriculture. Those looking for wood went to the area now known as Rancho Veloz, which at the time (around 1835) was named "realengo Las Cañas". According to the Cuban government's official Cuban history, this "realengo" was divided into three areas, one of which became known as "Santa Fe de las Pozas", and there, a person by the last name of Veloz built a ranch (rancho). Santa Fe de Las Pozas was the area's political and economic center by 1843.

Sugar became the town's main economic source and as many as 12 sugar refineries were active during the 1840s and 1850s. Slavery was also an economic source and by 1862, according to official figures, there were 3,721 slaves, compared to 1,297 white slave owners and 221 free Black or Mestizo persons, which meant that about 66% percent of the town's population was made up by slaves. It is not known when slavery was eradicated from the town, but official records show that the last people to be claimed as slaves were in the area around 1879.

In 1869, a fort was built to protect Rancho Veloz from attackers.

On January 1, 1879, Rancho Veloz had, for the first time, a mayor. His name was José Suárez Solís.

The first schools on record to open at Rancho Veloz were opened in 1888. These two educational centers consisted of an all girls school and an all boys one, which were situated in front of each other.

During 1889, the town's cathedral was inaugurated.

In 1936, the local fort was re-built due to corrosion affecting the original structure.

During 1937, Father Pertika Unanue, a Spaniard who would become popular among church goers in Rancho Veloz, arrived to the cathedral. He was pivotal in the creation of several programs and buildings in the town, including a local stadium. Father Unanue became a Cuban citizen, later dying in 1991.

1949 saw the opening of a Masonic temple. The town has remained virtually unchanged since then.

Geography
Rancho Veloz is located near the Atlantic coast, between Corralillo and Quemado de Güines, and the Biajaca River flows near it. It is crossed by the state highway Circuito Norte (CN) and by the railway line Corralillo-Sagua La Grande.

Personalities
Mirta de Perales (1922-2011), businesswoman

See also
Sierra Morena

References

External links

Populated places in Villa Clara Province
Populated places established in 1835
1835 establishments in Cuba
1835 establishments in North America
1835 establishments in the Spanish Empire